The discography of American hip hop recording artist Gunplay, consists of two studio albums, three compilation albums (with Maybach Music Group), ten mixtapes, and eleven singles. He has also released and recorded music with Southern hip hop group, Triple C's.

Albums

Studio albums

Collaborative albums

Mixtapes

Singles

As lead artist

Other charted songs

Guest appearances

See also
Triple C's discography

References

Discographies of American artists
Hip hop discographies